Henry Marion Howe (Boston, 2 March 1848 – Bedford Hills, New York, 14 May 1922) was an American metallurgist, the son of Samuel Gridley Howe and Julia Ward Howe.

Education
Howe attended the Boston Latin School, class of 1865, then Harvard College, class of 1869. In 1871, he graduated from the Massachusetts Institute of Technology (M.I.T.) with a degree of "graduate in the department of geology and mining science", later renamed a Bachelor of Science.

Career
He worked in industry from 1872 to 1882 in the iron and then the copper industries, in the U.S., Chile, Quebec, New Jersey, and Arizona. From 1883 to 1897, he was a consulting metallurgist in Boston, and simultaneously a lecturer at M.I.T. His first book, Copper Smelting, was published in 1885. His second book, The Metallurgy of Steel, was published in 1891. In 1897, he took a chair in metallurgy at Columbia University. In 1903, he published his Iron, Steel, and Other Alloys. He wrote the "Iron and Steel" article for the Encyclopædia Britannica, 11th edition (1911). He retired in 1913 and devoted himself to research in his Green Peace Laboratory at his home in Bedford Hills. In 1916, he published The Metallography of Steel and Cast Iron.

Honors
1895 Bessemer Gold Medal of the Iron and Steel Institute 
1895: Elliott Cresson Medal of the Franklin Institute of Philadelphia 
1917 John Fritz Gold Medal of the American Association of Engineering Societies
Howe was elected president of the American Institute of Mining Engineers in 1893, and chairman of the American Society for Testing Materials in 1900. He became a member of the National Research Council in 1918 and became its chairman in 1919.

Notes

Bibliography
 George K. Burgess, "Biographical Memoir Henry Marion Howe 1848-1922", National Academy of Sciences 21, 7th memoir full text, presented 1923, published 1927.

1848 births
1922 deaths
People from Boston
American metallurgists
American mining engineers
Boston Latin School alumni
Harvard University alumni
Massachusetts Institute of Technology School of Science alumni
Columbia University faculty
Massachusetts Institute of Technology faculty
People from Bedford Hills, New York
American expatriates in Chile
American expatriates in Canada
John Fritz Medal recipients
Scientists from New York (state)
Bessemer Gold Medal